Tiegai Township (Mandarin: 铁盖乡) is a township in Gonghe County, Hainan Tibetan Autonomous Prefecture, Qinghai, China. In 2010, Tiegai Township had a total population of 4,907: 2,473 males and 2,434 females: 1,137 aged under 14, 3,532 aged between 15 and 65 and 238 aged over 65.

References 

Township-level divisions of Qinghai
Hainan Tibetan Autonomous Prefecture